Hill Bay is a bay,  long and  wide, which indents eastern Anvers Island, Antarctica, between Spallanzani Point and Mitchell Point. Its head is fed by Grigorov, Laënnec and Mitev Glaciers.

The bay was roughly surveyed by the Admiralty Hydrographic Unit, 1951–52, and was named by the UK Antarctic Place-Names Committee for Leonard C. Hill of the Discovery Investigations, who served as an officer on RRS William Scoresby in January–February 1931, and on every Antarctic commission of RRS Discovery II between 1931 and 1939.

Maps 
 Antarctic Digital Database (ADD). Scale 1:250000 topographic map of Antarctica. Scientific Committee on Antarctic Research (SCAR). Since 1993, regularly upgraded and updated.
British Antarctic Territory. Scale 1:200000 topographic map. DOS 610 Series, Sheet W 64 62. Directorate of Overseas Surveys, Tolworth, UK, 1980.
Brabant Island to Argentine Islands. Scale 1:250000 topographic map. British Antarctic Survey, 2008.

External links 

 Hill Bay on USGS website
 Hill Bay on SCAR website
 Hill Bay Copernix satellite image

References 

Bays of the Palmer Archipelago